The Wisconsin Intercollegiate Athletic Conference men's basketball tournament is the annual conference basketball championship tournament for the NCAA Division III Wisconsin Intercollegiate Athletic Conference. The tournament has been held annually since 1999. It is a single-elimination tournament and seeding is based on regular season records.

The winner receives the WIAC's automatic bid to the NCAA Men's Division III Basketball Championship.

Results

Championship records

 Schools highlighted in pink are former members of the WIAC

References

NCAA Division III men's basketball conference tournaments
Basketball Tournament, Men's
Recurring sporting events established in 1999